The 1956 NBA All Star Game was the sixth NBA All-Star Game.

Roster

Western Conference
Head Coach: Charley Eckman, Fort Wayne Pistons

Eastern Conference
Head Coach: George Senesky, Philadelphia Warriors

References 

National Basketball Association All-Star Game
All-Star
1956 in sports in New York (state)
Sports in Rochester, New York
January 1956 sports events in the United States
Sports competitions in New York (state)
Events in Rochester, New York